GreatGuys is a South Korean boy band signed to DNA Entertainment. The group consists of nine members: Jaei, Uiyeon, Horyeong, Daun, Baekgyeol, Donghwi, Hwalchan, Haneul, and Dongin. The nonet debuted on August 25, 2017, with the single "Last Men". They received the Rookie of the Year Award at the 2018 Asia Model Awards. GreatGuys released their mini-albums Take Off in 2018, We're Not Alone_Chapter 1: It's You in 2019, and We're Not Alone_Chapter 2: You & Me in 2020.

History
The nine members of GreatGuys—Jaei, Uiyeon, Horyeong, Daun, Baekgyeol, Donghwi, Hwalchan, Haneul, and Dongin—were trainees for three years. The name of the group signifies their ability to be "show a cool image on and off stage". The nonet released their debut synth-pop digital single album Last Men and its title track on August 25, 2017. They held a showcase in Japan the following January. A tropical dance song, GreatGuys' second single album Ganda and eponymous title track was released on April 7, 2018. Main vocalist Daun contributed to the song's lyrics and Dongin wrote the rap portions of the track. A Japanese version was issued two months later. GreatGuy attended the 2018 Asia Model Awards, where they received the Rookie of the Year Award.

GreatGuys released their first mini-album Take Off on September 4, 2018. Its lead single "Illusion" is a hip hop-rock track. Hosted at Seoul National University, the group performed at the 2018 Hallyu Dream Donation Concert. They also held on a series of live concerts in Japan, Thailand, and Europe throughout November. At the end of the year, entertainment website Issue Daily bestowed them with the Bright New Artist Award. GreatGuys issued their third single album Trigger and its disco-influenced dance single "Dang!" on April 12, 2019. It was released as gratitude for the group's crowdfunding after it surpassed its funding goal by 400%. The first of three-part series, GreatGuys released their second mini-album We're Not Alone_Chapter 1: It's You on October 9. It was fronted by the R&B-tinged dance track "Be on You". GreatGuys performed as the only South Korean act at the All Together Asia Land festival in Ho Chi Minh City later that month.

GreatGuys embarked on a Caribbean tour in February 2020 and became the first K-pop group to hold a concert in the Dominican Republic. On June 26, GreatGuys released a remake of Deux's "In Summer". Reworked as a city pop track, it serves as the first of two lead singles from their third mini-album. Their third mini-album We're Not Alone_Chapter 2: You & Me and its second single "Run" were released on July 8.

GreatGuys returned with their first special album Again on April 18, 2021, with the lead single "Touch by Touch".

On July 20, 2022, GreatGuys released their fourth mini-album We're Not Alone Final: Only You, with the lead single "Blind Love".

Musical style
GreatGuys have cited BTS as their role models.

Members
List of members and roles.
 Jaei – leader, lead vocals
 Uiyeon – rap
 Horyeong – subvocals
 Daun – main vocals
 Baekgyeol – lead vocals
 Donghwi – main vocals
 Hwalchan – subvocals
 Haneul – subvocals
 Dongin – rap

Discography

Extended plays

Single albums

Singles

Awards and nominations

! 
|-
! scope="row" rowspan="2"|2018
| GreatGuys
| Asia Model Awards – Rookie of the Year Award
| 
| style="text-align:center;"|
|-
| GreatGuys
| Issue Daily – 2019 Bright New Artist Award
| 
| style="text-align:center;"|

References

External links
 

2017 establishments in South Korea
K-pop music groups
Musical groups established in 2017
Musical groups from Seoul
South Korean boy bands
South Korean dance music groups